Hexechamaesipho is a genus of star barnacles in the family Chthamalidae. There is one described species in Hexechamaesipho, H. pilsbryi.

References

Barnacles